This is a list of notable victims and survivors of the Auschwitz concentration camp; that is, victims and survivors about whom a significant amount of independent secondary sourcing exists. This list represents only a very small portion of the 1.1 million victims and survivors of Auschwitz and is not intended to be viewed as a representative or exhaustive count by any means.

Victims
Male victims are signified by a  background. Female victims are signified by a background.

 Hedwig Dulberg (7 January 1894 – 1944), German artist
 Simon Okker (1 June 1881 – 6 March 1944), Dutch Olympic fencer.
 Lion van Minden (10 June 1880 – 6 September 1944), Dutch Olympic fencer.
 Max Scheuer, Jewish Austrian footballer.
 Ettie Steinberg, (1914-1942), only Irish person killed in the Holocaust.
 Rosette Wolczak, (1928-1943), died in KZ Auschwitz

Survivors

 Lucie Adelsberger (1895–1971), German-Jewish physician
 Leo Bretholz (March 6, 1921 – March 8, 2014), Austrian Jew who escaped from train en route, author of Leap into Darkness (1998).
 Tadeusz Debski (1921–2011), Polish survivor, oldest person to receive a doctorate degree at University of Illinois at Chicago
 Laure Diebold (10 January 1915 – 17 October 1965),  French resistant, Compagnon de la Libération.
 Xawery Dunikowski (24 December 1875 – 26 January 1964), Polish sculptor and artist, best known for his Neo-Romantic sculptures and Auschwitz-inspired art.
 Kurt Epstein (January 29, 1904 – February 1, 1975), Czechoslovak Jewish Olympic water polo competitor
 Hans Frankenthal (July 15, 1926 – December 22, 1999), German-Jewish author.
 Viktor Frankl (26 March 1905 – 2 September 1997), Austrian-Jewish neurologist and psychiatrist.
 Hédi Fried (15 June 1924 – 20 November 2022) Hungarian-Jewish (from Sighet), author of The Road to Auschwitz: Fragments of a Life.
 Franciszek Gajowniczek (15 November 1901 – 13 March 1995), Polish Army Sergeant whose life was spared when Maximilian Kolbe took his place. Survived and died in 1995.
 Józef Garliński, Polish best-selling writer who wrote numerous books in both English and Polish on Auschwitz and World War II, including the best selling 'Fighting Auschwitz'. Survived and died in 2005.
 Leon Greenman (18 December 1910 – 7 March 2008),  British anti-fascism campaigner. Survived and died in 2008. Author of An Englishman in Auschwitz.
 Nicholas (Miklós) Hammer,(1920-2003), Hungarian-born Jew, who was placed in Auschwitz I block 6 and worked in the Kanada I section. Subject of the biography Sacred Games by Gerald Jacobs. Unusual as he was in labour, concentration and death camps before being liberated.
 Magda Hellinger
 Magda Herzberger (February 20, 1926 – April 23, 2021), Romanian-Jewish author and poet.
Joseph Friedenson (1922–2013), Polish-Jewish (from Łódź), editor of Dos Yiddishe Vort.
František Getreuer (1906–1945), Czech swimmer and Olympic water polo player, killed in Dachau concentration camp
 Hugo Gryn (25 June 1930 – 18 August 1996), senior rabbi, London.
 Adélaïde Hautval (1 January 1906 – 17 October 1988), French psychiatrist who refused to cooperate with medical experimentation at Auschwitz.
 Stefan Jaracz (24 December 1883 – 11 August 1945), Polish actor and theater director who survived camp but died of tuberculosis in 1945.
Imre Kertész (9 November 1929 – 31 March 2016) Hungarian writer, Nobel Laureate in Literature for 2002.
 Stanisław Kętrzyński (10 September 1878– 26 May 1950) Polish historian and diplomat.
 Gertrude "Traute" Kleinová  (August 13, 1918 – April 9, 1976), Czechoslovak Jew, 3-time table tennis world champion.
 Antoni Kocjan (12 August 1902 – 13 August 1944), Polish glider constructor and a contributor to the intelligence services of the Polish Home Army. Murdered by Gestapo in 1944.
Rena Kornreich Gelissen (24 August 1920 – 8 August 2006), Polish-Jewish (born in Tyliczi), author of Rena's Promise: A Story of Sisters in Auschwitz, survived.
 Zofia Kossak-Szczucka (10 August 1889 – 9 April 1968), Polish writer and World War II resistance fighter, co-founder the wartime Polish organization Żegota. Released through the efforts of the Polish underground.
 Henri Landwirth (March 7, 1927 – April 16, 2018), Belgian philanthropist and founder of Give Kids the World (survived).
Joel Lebowitz (born May 10, 1930), Mathematical Physicist. Survived. Honors include the Boltzmann Medal, Henri Poincaré Prize, and Max Planck Medal.
 Olga Lengyel (19 October 1908 – 15 April 2001), Hungarian-Jewish author of Five Chimneys (1946), survived.
Curt Lowens (17 November 1925 – 8 May 2017), German-Jewish actor and resistant, survived.
 Arnošt Lustig (21 December 1926 – 26 February 2011), Czechoslovak and later Czech Jewish writer and novelist, the Holocaust is his lifelong theme, survived.
 Branko Lustig (10 June 1932 – 14 November 2019), Croatian-American film producer.
 Edward Mosberg (1926-2022), Polish-American Holocaust survivor, educator, and philanthropist
 Filip Müller (1922–2013) inmate no. 29236, survivor and author of Eyewitness Auschwitz: Three Years in the Gas Chambers (1979).
 Alfred "Artem" Nakache (1915 – 1983), French swimmer, world record (200-m breaststroke), one-third of French 2x world record (3x100 relay team), imprisoned in Auschwitz, where his wife and daughter were killed.
 Igor Newerly (1903–1987), Polish novelist and educator.
Bernard Offen (born 1929), Polish documentary filmmaker working in Poland and the United States to create Second Generation Witnesses.
Ignacy Oziewicz (1887–1966), Polish army officer, first commandant of Narodowe Sily Zbrojne
 Lev Rebet (1912–1957) Ukrainian nationalist ideologist.
 Bernat Rosner (born 1932), Hungarian-Jewish lawyer, co-author of An uncommon friendship. Survived.
Vladek Spiegelman (1906–1982) Father of Art Spiegelman, author of Maus. Vladek Spiegelmann was the central character in Maus.
Anja Spiegelman, (1912–1968), Mother of Art Spiegelman, author of Maus.
 Józef Szajna (1922–2008) Polish scenery designer, stage director, playwright, theoretician of the theatre, painter and graphic artist.
 Leon Schiller, (1887–1954), Polish theater and film director, critic and theoretician. He was also a composer and wrote theater and radio screenplays.
Sigmund Strochlitz (1916–2006), Polish-American activist, confidant of Eli Wiesel, and served on the U.S. Holocaust Memorial Council (1978–86)
Menachem Mendel Taub (1923–2019), rabbi of Kaliv.
 Jack Tramiel (1928-2012), Polish-born businessman, founder of Commodore International. Rescued by the U.S. Army in April 1945.
 Rose Van Thyn (1921–2010), Auschwitz and Ravensbrueck survivor who directed Holocaust education activities in her adopted city of Shreveport, Louisiana.
 Simone Veil, née Simone Annie Jacob (1927-2017), French politician, survived.
 Shlomo Venezia (1923–2012), Greek-Jewish (born in Thessaloniki), author of Inside the Gas Chambers: Eight Months in the Sonderkommando of Auschwitz, survived.
 Rose Warfman (née Gluck) (1916–2016), French nurse, member of the French Resistance.
 Stanislaw Wygodzki (1923–2012), Polish-Jewish author, survived.

See also 
 List of victims of Nazism

References

Bibliography

 
 

 
N
Lists of survivors
 
The Holocaust-related lists